The North Coast Journal ("The Journal") is an alternative weekly newspaper serving Humboldt County, California. The Journal is published in Eureka, California and includes coverage of the arts, news, personages, and politics of the region.

Launched in 1990 as a monthly, the paper switched to a weekly in 1998. Over the years the publication has been produced in both Eureka and Arcata.

References

External links
 

Weekly newspapers published in California
Mass media in Humboldt County, California
Culture of Eureka, California
1990 establishments in California
Publications established in 1990